The Diocese of Southern Highlands is a south-western diocese in the Anglican Church of Tanzania: its current bishop is the Rt Revd Julius Lugendo.

Notes

Anglican Church of Tanzania dioceses
Southern Highlands, Tanzania